The Janeway Children's Health and Rehabilitation Centre is a children's hospital located in St. John's, Newfoundland and Labrador, Canada.

Overview
The Janeway is the only children's hospital in the province and functions, in partnership with Health Sciences Centre, as a teaching hospital for the Memorial University of Newfoundland Faculty of Medicine under the direction of the Eastern Regional Health Authority (Eastern Health).

The facility was founded as the Dr. Charles Alderson Janeway Child Health Centre in 1966 using the former base hospital on the recently closed Pepperrell Air Force Base in the east end of the city.  It was named after Charles Alderson Janeway, a pediatrician who is credited with helping to establish the hospital.  The name of the facility was modified to its present form in 2001 when a new state-of-the-art facility was opened as an annex of the Health Sciences Centre. Demolition of the old facility located in the former Pepperrel AFB started in September 2008 by Kelloway Construction, hired by the provincial government at a cost of $924,129. Clean-up of the site was completed in 2010 and in September 2015 a new long-term care facility "Pleasant View Towers" opened on Newfoundland Drive.

Services
The Janeway Children's Health and Rehabilitation Centre includes:

 42 Acute Care Medical Surgical beds 
 7 Acute care psychiatry beds 
 25 Neonatal Intensive Care beds 
 6 Pediatric Care Intensive Care beds 
 3 Operating rooms 
 Extensive Rehabilitation Centre 
 Diagnostic Treatment Services 
 Outpatient Services 
 Outreach Programs in Diabetes, Asthma, Cystic Fibrosis, and Hemophilia 
 Pediatric Emergency Department 
 Therapeutic Pool 
 therapeutic play garden
 Janeway Hospital School, operated by the English School District

See also

 Kevin Chan
 List of children's hospitals

References

External links
 Janeway Children's Hospital Foundation - official website
 CBC: Old Janeway hospital to be demolished

Children's hospitals in Canada
Hospital buildings completed in 2001
Hospitals in Newfoundland and Labrador
Teaching hospitals in Canada
Buildings and structures in St. John's, Newfoundland and Labrador
Hospitals established in 1966